The 1973–74 Cypriot First Division was the 35th season of the Cypriot top-level football league.

Overview
It was contested by 14 teams, and AC Omonia won the championship. APOEL participated in the Greek championship as the previous year's champions. They finished in 14th position and were not relegated.

League standings

Results

References
Cyprus - List of final tables (RSSSF)

Cypriot First Division seasons
Cypriot First Division, 1973-74
1